Aristokrat Records is a Nigerian record label owned by The Aristokrat Group. The label operates as a subsidiary of The Aristokrat Group, an African Media & Entertainment company. It units includes; Aristokrat 360, Aristokrat Publishing, and Aristokrat Lifestyle. On 11 May 2020, Universal Music France announced its partnership with Aristokrat Records, under the watch of The Aristokrat Group, as the label will now distribute under its label services Caroline France, and publish under Universal Music Publishing Group.  As the joint partnership will also help discover and develop exciting new African talent, giving artistes and songwriters the opportunity to reach global audiences with support from Universal Music Group of companies around the world; say's Piriye in an interview with This Day.

It services includes, music recording, distribution, merchandising, audiovisual content, music publishing, branding, and management.

The label is home to recording acts, such as Jujuboy Star, T’neeya, and Ria Sean. It also houses producer Kel-P, and Saszy Afroshii; a disc jockey DJ Bally, who also signed a management deal with Aristokrat 360 in 2018. Artists formerly signed to the label, include Burna Boy, LeriQ, Kamar, Mojeed, Ozone, Pucado, and Dj Consequence, who served as the first official disc jockey signed to the label.

History
Aristokrat Records was founded in 2010 by Piriye Isokrari, under the entertainment company, The Aristokrat Group. It operates as a part of 960 Music Group, a Nigerian music and entertainment company, is known for acquiring forty percent stake in Aristokrat Records. Piriye Isokrari, signed Afrobeats artist, Burna Boy in 2012, with alternative Afrobeat record producer LeriQ. In 2014, Piriye, signed Kamar, Mojeed, Ozone, and Pucado. In 2015, he signed DJ Consequence, and T’neeya, joined in 2018, with a worldwide deal. On 13 November 2020, the label unveiled the signing of Jujuboy Star to Aristokrat Records, with a distribution deal with Caroline France.  On 6 June 2021, the label unveiled Ria Sean.

Artistokrat divisions

Aristokrat 360
The Aristokrat Group founded Aristokrat 360, under Aristokrat Records in 2018, as a division for artist management for Aristokrat. In June 2018, DJ Bally signed a management deal with Aristokrat 360. In 2020, Seyi Shay, Saszy Afroshii, TMXO, and DJ Obi, signed a management deal with Aristokrat 360.

Aristokrat Publishing
The Aristokrat Group, and Universal Music Publishing France founded Aristokrat Publishing, under Aristokrat Records via Universal Music France in 2020, as its division for music publishing in Africa. Same year, Saszy Afroshii signed a publishing deal with Aristokrat Publishing, and  Seyi Shay joined her in 2021 via Universal Music Publishing Group.

Aristokrat Lifestyle
The Aristokrat Group, founded Aristokrat Lifestyle, under Aristokrat Records in 2019, as its division for label branding, and merchandising.

Departures

Burna Boy
Burna Boy's departure surfaced after his two years deal with Aristokrat expired in 2014, during his stay with the label, he released and promoted, various projects, and singles including "Like To Party", which was his breakthrough single, and the lead single from his debut studio album L.I.F.E in 2013, exclusively produced by LeriQ, and Piriye Isokrari.

Artists

Management

Current acts

Former acts

Producers

Current producers
 Kel-P
 Saszy Afroshii

Former producer
 LeriQ

Discography

Albums/Mixtape/EP

References 

Record labels established in 2010
Nigerian record labels
Companies based in Lagos
Entertainment companies established in 2010